Petko is a South Slavic (Петко) masculine given name and East Slavic (Петько) surname. It may refer to:

Given name
Petko Petkov (disambiguation)
Petko Slaveykov (1827–1895), 19th-century Bulgarian poet, publicist, public figure and folklorist
Petko Staynov (1896–1977), Bulgarian composer and pianist
Petko Voyvoda (1844–1900), 19th-century Bulgarian revolutionary
Petko Yankov (born 1977), retired Bulgarian sprinter
Petko Karavelov (1843–1903), leading Bulgarian liberal politician
Petko Ilić (1886–1912), Serbian Chetnik

Surname
Svetlana Petko (born 1970), professional Russian football goalkeeper
Serhiy Petko (born 1994), professional Ukrainian football midfielder
Miroslav Petko (born 1995), professional Slovak footballer

Geography
Petko Slaveykov (village), a village in the municipality of Sevlievo, in Gabrovo Province, in northern central Bulgaria
Kapitan Petko voyvoda, a village in the municipality of Topolovgrad, in Haskovo Province, in southern Bulgaria
Petko Voyvoda Peak, in the Delchev Ridge, Tangra Mountains, Livingston Island, Antarctica

See also
 
Petkov, surname
Petković, surname

Bulgarian masculine given names
Serbian masculine given names
Macedonian masculine given names
Russian-language surnames
Ukrainian-language surnames
Slovak-language surnames